Weddell Plain is an undersea abyssal plain named in association with the Weddell Sea. Name approved 6/87 (ACUF 225).

References

Abyssal plains of the Southern Ocean